The Lansdowne portrait is an iconic life-size portrait of George Washington painted by Gilbert Stuart in 1796. It depicts the 64-year-old President of the United States during his final year in office. The portrait was a gift to former British Prime Minister William Petty, 1st Marquess of Lansdowne, and spent more than 170 years in England.

Stuart painted three copies of the Lansdowne, and five portraits that were closely related to it. His most famous copy has hung in the East Room of the White House since 1800. Numerous other artists also painted copies.

In 2001, to preclude the original portrait's possible sale at auction, the National Portrait Gallery in Washington, D.C. purchased it for $20,000,000.

Jay Treaty
The Lansdowne portrait likely (and fancifully) depicts President Washington's December 7, 1795 annual address to the Fourth U.S. Congress. The highly unpopular Jay Treaty, settling claims between the United States and Great Britain left over from the Revolutionary War, had been presented to the U.S. Senate for approval earlier in the year. The Senate held a special session to debate the treaty in June, at which opposition to it had been fierce. Only two-thirds of the 30 senators (the minimum required under the U.S. Constitution) approved the treaty in mid-August, and Washington, who strongly supported the treaty, signed it in late August. In his annual address, delivered to Congress on opening day of its next session, the President acknowledged the struggle over the Jay Treaty, and called for unity. There was lingering resentment in the House of Representatives, which expressed its displeasure by declining to appropriate funding for the treaty's implementation until April 1796.

In England, the Lansdowne portrait was celebrated as Washington's endorsement of the Jay Treaty:

The portrait presented by the President  to the Marquis of Lansdowne is one of the finest pictures we have seen since the death of Reynolds. The dress he wears is plain black velvet; he has his sword on, upon the hilt of which one hand rests while the other is extended, as the figure is standing and addressing the Hall of Assembly. The point of time is that when he recommended inviolable union between America and Great Britain.

Washington's December 7, 1795 address was the last that he delivered to Congress in person. The following year the President published his Farewell Address in the newspapers, rather than delivering it to Congress.

Stuart
Gilbert Stuart and his family were Loyalists, and moved from Rhode Island to Canada early in the Revolutionary War. Stuart himself lived and painted in London from 1775 to 1787, and in Dublin from 1787 to 1793. Following almost eighteen years abroad, the artist returned to the United States in early 1793.

Lord Lansdowne – who as British Prime Minister had secured a peaceful end to the War – commissioned Stuart to paint a portrait of George Washington. Lansdowne may have placed the order prior to the artist's 1793 departure for the United States. Stuart lived and worked in New York City for a year and a half before moving to Philadelphia in November 1794. He informed his uncle in Philadelphia of his upcoming arrival: "The object of my journey is only to secure a picture of the President, & finish yours."

Philadelphia served as the temporary national capital from 1790 to 1800 – while Washington, D.C. was under construction. Stuart was introduced to the President in December 1794, at one of Mrs. Washington's Friday evening "drawingrooms." But it was not until the following fall that Washington granted him a sitting. Meanwhile, Stuart gathered orders for portraits—among his papers is a document titled: "A list of gentlemen who are to have copies of the portrait of the President of the United States." and dated: "Philadelphia. April 20th, 1795." Lord Lansdowne's name was third on the list of thirty-two subscribers.

Sittings
According to Rembrandt Peale, President Washington granted a single joint sitting to Stuart and him "in the Autumn of 1795." Stuart was not wholly satisfied with the resulting head-and-bust portrait, but still painted between twelve and sixteen copies of it. Now known as the "Vaughan-style" portraits, the original of these is in the National Gallery of Art. 

While visiting London a decade earlier, Senator William Bingham of Pennsylvania and his wife, Anne Willing Bingham, had sat for a family portrait by Stuart (unlocated). The artist seems to have approached Mrs. Bingham for assistance in getting the President to grant him another sitting:

According to Rembrandt Peale, this was the only sitting Washington granted for the Lansdowne portrait. It took place at Stuart's studio (and lodgings) in the William Moore Smith house, at the southeast corner of 5th & Chestnut Streets. With severely limited time, Stuart was forced to concentrate on the President's head and face. There are multiple claims as to who posed for the body of the figure, including his landlord, Smith.

Stuart began the portrait in Philadelphia and completed it in Germantown, then some  outside the city. To avoid distractions, the artist rented a Germantown house in Summer 1796 and set up a studio on the second floor of its stable. The Binghams had enjoyed Lord Lansdowne's hospitality in London, and persuaded Stuart to allow them to pay for the portrait. Stuart completed the Lansdowne portrait by the fall of 1796, and Senator Bingham paid his fee of $1,000. Bingham had an ornate frame made for the portrait, and arranged for it to be shipped to England in late November. Lord Lansdowne had received the portrait by March 5, 1797, when he mentioned it in a letter. Lansdowne's letter of thanks to Mrs. Bingham survives, but is undated:

A very fine portrait of the greatest man living in a magnificent frame found its way into my hall, with no one thing left for me to do regarding it, except to thank the amiable donor of it. It is universally approv'd and admir'd, and I see with satisfaction, that there is no one who does not turn away from every thing else, to pay their homage to General Washington. Among many circumstances which contribute to enhance the value of it, I shall always consider the quarter from whence it comes as most flattering, & I look forward with the greatest pleasure to the time of shewing you and Mr. Bingham where I have plac'd it.

Copies
Stuart's first copy of the portrait was for the Binghams (now at the Pennsylvania Academy of the Fine Arts), and would have been completed before the original left his studio in late 1796. The President and First Lady visited Germantown on January 7, 1797: "Road [rode] to German Town with Mrs. Washington to see Mr. Stuarts paintings." The Bingham copy was still in the studio on July 27, 1797, when Robert Gilmor Jr. viewed it. The William Kerin Constable copy (now at the Brooklyn Museum) was completed that same month. The Gardiner Baker copy (now at the White House) is presumed to have been the copy commissioned by Charles Cotesworth Pinckney in September 1796, likely as a diplomatic gift to France. Pinckney paid for but never retrieved his copy of the portrait from Stuart's studio, and the artist seems to have resold it to Baker by December 1797.

Provenance
After the death of Lord Lansdowne, his pictures were sold by auction. The Washington was purchased by Samuel Williams, an English  merchant, for $2,000. Williams subsequently became insolvent, and his creditors disposed of the Washington by a lottery. Forty tickets were sold, at fifty guineas each. The picture fell to Mr. J. Delaware Lewis, a nephew of Mr. William D. Lewis, of Philadelphia. But few Americans had ever seen the picture, and Mr. William D. Lewis, who was Chairman of the Committee on Art, obtained the loan of it from his nephew for the Centennial Exhibition. It was sent out with the loan collection from England, unpacked at Memorial Hall, and hung up in the British section before its arrival was known to the Fine Arts Committee. An effort was subsequently made to have it transferred to the American section, but it was unsuccessful. At the close of the Exhibition, it was returned to its owner in England.

Chronology
1796 – Painted by Gilbert Stuart.
1797 – Presented by Senator William Bingham and his wife Anne Willing Bingham as a gift to William Petty, the first Marquis of Lansdowne (died 1805). 
1806 – Purchased in March, at the sale of the Marquis's estate by Samuel Williams, an American merchant living in England.
1827 – Purchased through lottery by John Delaware Lewis (1774–1841), an American merchant living in England. 
1841 – Inherited by John Delaware Lewis Jr. (1828–1884), son of the American and later a British Member of Parliament
1876 – Exhibited at the Centennial Exposition in Philadelphia.
1884 – Inherited by Herman LeRoy Lewis.
1889 – Purchased by Archibald Philip Primrose, fifth Earl of Rosebery; by family descent to Lord Harry Dalmeny.
1968 – Placed on long-term loan to the National Portrait Gallery. 
2001 – Purchased by the National Portrait Gallery, with $20 million from The Donald W. Reynolds Foundation. The Foundation donated an additional $10 million to renovate the National Portrait Gallery and to fund a traveling exhibition of the portrait.

Description and analysis

The painting is full of symbolism, drawn from American and ancient Roman symbols of the Roman Republic. Stuart painted Washington from life, showing him standing up, dressed in a black velvet suit with an outstretched hand held up in an oratorical manner. Behind Washington is a row of two Doric columns, with another row to the left. Wrapped around and between the columns are red tasseled drapes.

Washington's suit is plain and simple, and the sword he holds on his left side is a dress sword and not a battle sword (symbolizing a democratic form of government, rather than a monarchy or military dictatorship). In the sky, storm clouds appear on the left while a rainbow appears on the right, signifying the American Revolutionary War giving way to the peace and prosperity of the new United States after the 1783 Treaty of Paris. The medallion at the top of the chair shows the red, white, and blue colors of the American flag.

On and under the tablecloth-draped table to the left are two books: Federalist—probably a reference to the Federalist Papers—and Journal of Congress—the Congressional Record. Another five books are under the table: the three to the right are General Orders, American Revolution, and Constitutional Bylaws—symbolizing Washington's leadership as commander-in-chief of the Continental Army and president of the Constitutional Convention.

The pen and paper on the table signify the rule of law. The table's leg is carved as a fasces, a bundle of bound wooden rods that symbolized imperial power and authority in ancient Rome. On the table is a silver inkwell, emblazed with George Washington's coat of arms, which alludes to his signing of the Jay Treaty. A white quill rests upon silver dogs, ancient symbols of loyalty. Behind these on the table is the President's large black hat.

Washington's unusually clenched facial expression comes from his famous false teeth. Jean-Antoine Houdon's marble sculpture of Washington shows a more natural expression. Stuart wrote: "When I painted him [Washington], he had just had a set of false teeth inserted, which accounts for the constrained expression so noticeable about the mouth and lower part of the face ... Houdon's bust does not suffer from this defect."

Alternate versions

Constable-Hamilton portrait
Stuart painted a 1797 seated portrait of Washington, based on the Lansdowne. William Kerin Constable, who commissioned the Lansdowne copy now at the Brooklyn Museum, also commissioned the seated version. Constable presented it to Alexander Hamilton in 1797. The portrait remained in the Hamilton family until 1896, when it was bequeathed to the Lenox Library. The Lenox Library later merged with the New York Public Library. The portrait was auctioned at Sotheby's NY, 30 November 2005, lot 3, and sold for $8,136,000. The Constable-Hamilton Portrait is now in the collection of the Crystal Bridges Museum of American Art, in Bentonville, Arkansas.

Munro-Lenox portrait
Stuart made several changes for the Munro-Lenox portrait (1800): Washington's head is slightly turned, and his hand is on the table, rather than gesturing into the air. The President looks directly at the viewer, rather than off to the side, which makes it a more compelling image than the Lansdowne. The head appears to be based on Stuart's Athenaeum portrait (the image on the one-dollar bill). The wall behind the President is lowered, allowing for a more dramatic scene of the sun breaking through the storm clouds. After 135 years of ownership by the New York Public Library, the Munro-Lenox portrait was deassessioned and offered for auction in 2005. It failed to sell at auction, and was sold in a private sale for an undisclosed amount to Michael and Judy Steinhardt.

Stuart painted three full-size copies of the Munro-Lenox Portrait, one for the Connecticut State House in Hartford; and two for Rhode Island—one for the State House in Providence, and the other for Old Colony House in Newport.

Painted by Gilbert Stuart

Copies painted by other artists
The Lansdowne and Munro-Lenox portraits were copied many times, and reproduced in widely circulated prints. William Winstanley (1775–1806), a British landscape painter working in the United States, reportedly painted six full-size copies of the Lansdowne. During the 19th century, Jane Stuart (the artist's daughter) painted multiple copies of the Lansdowne in full and reduced sizes. Alonzo Chappel included elements of the Lansdowne in his 1860 seated portrait of Washington (Metropolitan Museum of Art).

Lansdowne type
 The Catholic University of America, Washington, D.C., unknown artist (possibly William Winstanley), 1798 or later
 Washington and Lee University, Lexington, Virginia, unknown artist (possibly William Winstanley), 1798 or later
 Private collection (deaccessioned from the Art Institute of Chicago), unknown artist (possibly William Winstanley), 1798 or later
 New York State Capitol, Albany, New York, by Ezra Ames, 1813
 Rayburn Room, U.S. Capitol, unknown artist (possibly William Winstanley), by 1816
Inscription: "Presented to the Legation of the United States at Madrid by Richard W. Meade of Philadelphia, December 11th, 1818."
Relocated from the U.S. Embassy in Madrid to the U.S. Capitol, 1951.
 North Carolina State House, Raleigh, North Carolina, by Thomas Sully, commissioned 1816, installed 1818. Now in the House of Representatives Chamber, North Carolina State Capitol.
Kuhl-Harrison reduced-size portrait, (36 1/4 in x 24 in), unlocated, Gilbert Stuart and Jane Stuart, by 1828
 Philadelphia Masonic Temple, Philadelphia, Pennsylvania, unknown artist, 1832
 Maryland Historical Society, Baltimore, Maryland, unknown artist, 1830s
 Providence Athenaeum, Providence, Rhode Island, unknown Italian artist, 1830s
The Greenbrier, White Sulphur Springs, West Virginia, by Jane Stuart, mid-19th century
Reduced-size portrait, Redwood Library and Athenaeum, Newport, Rhode Island, Jane Stuart, mid-19th century
Birmingham Museum of Art, Birmingham, Alabama, by Theodore Ramos (1928–2018), 1965. On loan to American Village, Montevallo, Alabama.

Munro-Lenox type
 Minneapolis Institute of Art, Minneapolis, Minnesota, by Thomas Sully, 
 U.S. House of Representatives Chamber, U.S. Capitol,  by John Vanderlyn, 1834
 National Portrait Gallery, London, United Kingdom (on loan to Montreal Museum of Fine Arts), unknown artist (possibly William Winstanley), undated
Corcoran Art Gallery, Washington, D.C., by Jane Stuart, 1854.
National Portrait Gallery, Washington, D.C. (on long-term loan), unknown artist, undated
 Fall River Public Library, Massachusetts, by Robert Spear Dunning, 1892

Related works
Engraving: General Washington  by James Heath, 1800, London
George Washington by Alonzo Chappel, c.1860, Metropolitan Museum of Art
Chromolithograph: George Washington by Augustus Weidenbach, 1876

See also
 Art in the White House

Notes

References

External links
"The Portrait." George Washington: A National Treasure. National Portrait Gallery, Smithsonian Institution. georgewashington.si.edu
Kellogg, Stuart. "By George!" Victor Valley Daily Press (CA). November 16, 2002.
Google Art Project: White House copy, Brooklyn Museum copy
Carrie Rebora Barratt and Ellen G. Miles, Gilbert Stuart, (2004), a full text exhibition catalog from The Metropolitan Museum of Art 
"Artist Gilbert Stuart’s Portraits of George Washington," from History, Art & Archives, U.S. House of Representatives

 

1796 paintings
George Washington in art
Paintings in the National Portrait Gallery (United States)
Paintings in the Pennsylvania Academy of the Fine Arts
Paintings in the United States Capitol
Art in the White House
Portraits of politicians
Portraits of men
Books in art
18th-century portraits
Paintings by Gilbert Stuart